Crayford railway station is in the London Borough of Bexley in south-east London, in Travelcard Zone 6. The station and all trains serving it are operated by Southeastern.

Down trains run eastbound to Dartford, Gravesend and to London Cannon Street via Slade Green, and up trains run westbound to Cannon Street and London Charing Cross via Lewisham. Ticket barriers are in operation.

History

Crayford station was opened in September 1866. The original station building, like most of the Dartford Loop Line stations, was built cheaply of clapboard. The station had a brick-built goods shed on the up side. The goods yard had only two tracks with no direct connection to the adjacent waterworks, brickworks and gravel pit. Two additional sidings were eventually constructed on the down side. For many years there was no connection between the two platforms except for a track crossing. A footbridge was provided at the eastern ends of the platforms in 1926 when the line was electrified. A SER-designed signal box at the western end of the down platform was built around 1892.

In 1955 both platforms were lengthened to accommodate ten carriage trains. The goods yard closed in May 1963.  In 1968 the station buildings were completely rebuilt using pre-fabricated CLASP structures. The signal box closed in November 1970.

The footbridge remains the oldest part of the station. The two sidings on the down side remained for many years and were still in use until the mid-1990s. By 2000 the sidings had fallen out of use and were subsequently disconnected, but the sleepers and rails still remain in position.

In 2000 the ticket office caught fire and was damaged beyond economical repair. The following year a new building appeared in its place together with palisade fencing alongside the rear of both platforms.

Location

The station is situated in Lower Station Road, close to Crayford Town Centre.

Services 

The typical off-peak service in trains per hour is:

The station is also served by a single peak hour return service between Dartford and London Blackfriars.

Connections
Crayford station is served by London Buses route 492 to Bluewater via Dartford and to Sidcup via Bexleyheath.

References

External links

Railway stations in the London Borough of Bexley
Former South Eastern Railway (UK) stations
Railway stations in Great Britain opened in 1866
Railway stations served by Southeastern
1866 establishments in England